Syntexis libocedrii, (also called the cedar wood wasp or incense-cedar wood wasp) is the only living species in the wood wasp family Anaxyelidae, within the Symphyta, though the family has an extensive Mesozoic fossil record. This species is thus a "living fossil". It has the remarkable behavior of ovipositing only in recently burnt incense-cedar (Calocedrus), red cedar (Thuja) or juniper (Juniperus). The wood is often still smoldering while the wasp is laying its eggs, and the larvae develop in the wood. S. libocedrii occurs from the mountains of central California to southern British Columbia, but is very rarely seen, except by firefighters.

References

Bibliography 

 

Sawflies
Insects described in 1915
Taxa named by Sievert Allen Rohwer